Brij Mohan Amar Rahe is a 2018 Indian Hindi-language action comedy film directed by Nikhil Bhat. The film stars Arjun Mathur, Nidhi Singh, Sheetal Thakur, Manav Vij, Sunny Hinduja, Vijayant Kohli and Yogendra Tikku in key roles.

Plot 
The film opens with Brij Mohan Gupta (Arjun Mathur), a man in his mid-thirties, making out with Simi (Sheetal Thakur), his 24-year-old Girlfriend. Brij is the owner of a hosiery store, which isn't profitable enough to lead a successful life. He is also fed up with his ball-crusher, loud-mouthed wife Sweety (Nidhi Singh), who doesn't even think twice before spending his hard earned money. Brij is also under a lot of debt.

To make a quick buck, Brij takes a loan of 2.5 Million from Raghu, through a business deal with Suri. However, this was all a ruse created by Suri who sold off his old material to Brij and he is left to pay Raghu the money. Raghu slowly starts threatening and harassing Brij. Brij plans to fake his death, but to no avail as he can't find a perfect body that matches his features to fake his dead body.

In a quarrel with Raghu, Brij pushes him down the stairs, nearly killing him. Brij decides to fake his death with Raghu's. After doing everything, even exchanging his gold tooth, Brij ties Raghu to the car, and sets it on fire, burning Raghu alive.

Brij adopts the new name Amar Sethi and shaves his head and beard. He hides in a small hotel with Simi along with the money he stole from Raghu's locker. The police get to know of Brij's disappearance through Sweety (as a store owner accused her of giving a false cheque originally signed by Brij). Inspector Beniwal is drawn towards Sweety. And she uses it as a ploy.

Simi gets frustrated while living with Amar alias Brij, as she is locked up in their room and Brij can't even make it during sex. Simi finds the money that Brij had hidden and tries to run away with it, but he catches her and, in the ensuing fight, kills Simi. Beniwal finds the burnt body (of Raghu) and claims it as Brij's, as it has a gold tooth identified by Sweety. After the funeral rites of Brij, Beniwal and Sweety make love in front of Brij's photograph.

Meanwhile, a missing mobile phone report is launched (which belonged to Brij) and they arrest Amar for robbing the phone. He says he doesn't know anything. Beniwal had already learned that Amar is in fact Brij for Sweety but he keeps that fact to himself. After a hilarious interrogation, Amar admits that he is Brij. But the police doesn't believe him. Brij is sent to life imprisonment, but Beniwal decides to set him free in exchange for money. But Brij evades him and runs away with the money. The judge doesn't get his money, and in anger announces the verdict to hang Amar for the murder of Brij.

Cast 
 Arjun Mathur as Brij Mohan Gupta
 Nidhi Singh as Sweety Gupta
 Sheetal Thakur as Simmi
 Manav Vij as Inspector Beniwal
 Sunny Hinduja as Raghu
 Yogendra Tiku as Sinha Judge
 Vijayant Kohli as Suri- Shop Owner
 Aanchal Chauhan as Chamki- The Prostitute

Soundtrack 
The music for the film has been done by Andrew T. Mackay. A song titled "Balma Yeh Karma" from the film was released on 4 August 2017.

Reception 
Brij Mohan Amar Rahe received generally negative reviews from critics. Rohan Nahar of Hindustan Times gave the film 1 star out of 5 and called the film the worst entry from Netflix Indian original film. Karishma Upadhyay of First Post gave 1 star out of 5. She praised the main cast and felt the film length is a drag. Vinod Kathayat of Movies Forever gave 2 stars out of 5 and called the film a missed opportunity.

References

External links 
 

2018 films
Indian action comedy films
2010s Hindi-language films
Hindi-language Netflix original films
Indian direct-to-video films
Films set in Delhi
2018 direct-to-video films
2018 action comedy films